The Korisliiga is the premier basketball league in Finland. The 2006-07 season was the 67th Finnish club basketball season. It began on September 30, 2006 and ended on April 24, 2007. Espoon Honka won the Final series by 3-0 against Namika Lahti and obtained their sixth national championship. Sami Lehtoranta won the MVP Award and Jukka Matinen won the Finals MVP Award.

Regular season

Individual leaders 
Statistics are for the regular season.

Scoring

Assists

Rebounds

Playoffs

References
 Korisliiga Schedule & Results

Korisliiga seasons
Finnish
Koris